The Moody House is a historic house at 104 Market Street in Bald Knob, Arkansas.  It is a single-story wood-frame structure, with a gabled roof, vertical siding, and a foundation of brick piers.  A gabled porch extends across most of the front, supported by box columns.  Built about 1915, it is one of White County's few surviving houses from that period.

The house was listed on the National Register of Historic Places in 1992.

See also
National Register of Historic Places listings in White County, Arkansas

References

Houses on the National Register of Historic Places in Arkansas
Houses completed in 1914
Houses in White County, Arkansas
National Register of Historic Places in White County, Arkansas
Buildings and structures in Bald Knob, Arkansas
1914 establishments in Arkansas